Number One Observatory Circle is the official residence of the vice president of the United States. Located on the northeast grounds of the U.S. Naval Observatory in Washington, D.C., the house was built in 1893 for the observatory superintendent. The chief of naval operations (CNO) liked the house so much that in 1923 he took over the house for himself. It remained the residence of the CNO until 1974, when Congress authorized its transformation to an official residence for the vice president, though a temporary one. It is still the "official temporary residence of the vice president of the United States" by law. The 1974 congressional authorization covered the cost of refurbishment and furnishing the house.

Although Number One Observatory Circle was made available to the vice president in 1974, more than two years passed before a vice president lived full-time in the house. Vice President Gerald Ford became president before he could use the house. His vice president, Nelson Rockefeller, primarily used the home for entertainment as he already had a well-secured residence in Washington, D.C., though the Rockefellers donated millions of dollars' worth of furnishings to the house. Vice President Walter Mondale was the first vice president to move into the house. Every vice president since has lived there.

The vice-presidential mansion was refurbished by the United States Navy in early 2001, slightly delaying the move of Vice President Dick Cheney and his family. Similarly, Vice President Kamala Harris delayed moving in until April 2021 while renovations occurred.

History

Early history

The house at One Observatory Circle was designed by architect Leon E. Dessez and built in 1893 for $20,000 (equivalent to $ in ) for the use of the superintendent of the Naval Observatory who was the original resident. Northview had been the property of widow Margaret Barber, who at the time of the abolition of slavery in the District in 1862 was one of its largest slaveholders.  

The observatory was moved from Foggy Bottom to its present location the same year the house was completed and 12 observatory superintendents lived in what was then known as The Superintendent's House. In 1928, with the passage of Public Law 630, Congress appropriated it for the chief of naval operations, and in June 1929, Charles Hughes became the first resident of what became known as Admiral's House. For the next 45 years, it served as the home of such Admirals as Richard Leigh, Chester Nimitz, and Elmo Zumwalt.

Previous vice presidential residences and legislation
Previously, serving vice presidents had lived in hotels or their own private homes. In 1923, to honor her late husband, Senator John B. Henderson's widow offered to provide their newly built home as an official residence. President Calvin Coolidge, who lived in a hotel when he served as vice president from 1921 to 1923, wrote in his autobiography that an "official residence with suitable maintenance should be provided for the Vice-President," and that the office "should have a settled and permanent habitation and a place, irrespective of the financial ability of its temporary occupant."

In 1966, the House Public Works Committee approved the construction of a three-story vice presidential residence at the Naval Observatory. A month later, President Lyndon B. Johnson suspended construction until the economy improved; construction never restarted.

The exact location was to be determined later by the GAO and the Navy. Construction was to commence on the residence when funding was available once the Vietnam War was over. In the interim, the Secret Service paid for expensive upgrades to the private homes of vice presidents Hubert Humphrey, Spiro Agnew, and Gerald Ford. Agnew lived in his house for only three months in 1973 before resigning; shortly after, he sold it at a large profit, in part because of the upgrades (additional quarters for the Secret Service, fences and a new driveway for example), paid for by the government. This resulted in a minor scandal. A subsequent investigation showed that it would be cheaper to immediately set up the new vice presidential residence rather than secure private homes.

Rockefeller and Mondale
In July 1974, Congress passed a new law to make Admiral's House the "official temporary residence of the vice president of the United States" effective upon the termination of service of the incumbent chief of naval operations. Work began on preparing Admiral's House to be the temporary vice president's residence later that fall, after Richard Nixon's resignation and move of the CNO to Quarters A at the Navy Yard. The decision was largely made as it was increasingly expensive to add security and communicative equipment to each new vice presidential residence. Elmo Zumwalt was the last chief of naval operations to live in Number One Observatory Circle before it became the official residence of the vice president. For Zumwalt, not pleased with the choice, this was reason enough to challenge Virginia senator Harry F. Byrd Jr. in the 1976 Senate election.

The 1974 renovation replaced and updated building systems and increased the size of several rooms by removing internal walls. As a part of this renovation, interior trim was painted white, and the walls a palette of mostly neutral colors. Little consideration was given to historic preservation with interior or exterior spaces. No attempt was made to restore any interior space to its appearance at the period of construction or early use. The 1961 era white paint on the exterior was retained. Second-floor shutters, which appear in an 1895 photograph, were reinstalled.

The house formally opened as the vice presidential residence in September 1975. Vice President Gerald Ford would have been the first resident if President Richard Nixon hadn't resigned, leaving the White House to Ford. The new vice president Nelson Rockefeller chose to live in his larger private home instead and used Admiral's House only for entertaining. In January 1977, Walter Mondale became the first vice president to live in the house, and it has served as the home of every vice president since.

Later vice presidents
Instead of building a new vice presidential residence, One Observatory Circle continued to have extensive remodels. In 1976, the Navy spent $276,000 to replace 22 window units with steam heat and central air conditioning; the leaky roof was replaced in 1980 with slate. In 1981, George H. W. Bush and Second Lady Barbara raised $187,000 for carpeting, furniture, and upholstery when they moved in. The next year the Navy spent $34,000 to repair the porch roof. Repairs to interior and exterior walls damaged by water seepage amounted to $225,000, and $8,000 more was spent to build a small master bedroom. Bush also constructed a horseshoe pit and quarter-mile track around the residence. During his eight years at the residence, Vice President Bush hosted over 900 parties.

Dan Quayle delayed his move in by a month in 1989, for an extensive $300,000 remodelling that included a rebuilt third floor with bedrooms suitable for children, a wheelchair-accessible entrance, and an upgraded bathroom off the vice president's room.  A putting green was added in 1989 and a swimming pool, hot tub, and pool house in 1991 – all paid for by private donations. A  skylit exercise room was added to the rooftop around that time, and numerous security enhancements were also performed.

The Navy, responsible for upkeep on the residence, decided in 1991 that Congress would never build a permanent vice president's residence (ostensibly next door to Admiral's House) and opted instead to remodel and repair the house substantially. Al Gore agreed to delay his move into the house by nearly six months in 1993 to allow for the largest renovation of the house since 1974. The $1.6 million repair job replaced the heating, air conditioning and plumbing, removed asbestos, rewired the electrical, replaced the ventilation systems, restored the porch, and upgraded the family quarters on the second floor.

In 1991, during the tenure of Vice President Dan Quayle, a non-profit organization, the Vice President's Residence Foundation, was founded to raise funds to redecorate the residency. Quayle also added an exercise room and a pool to the house.

Vice President Mike Pence and Second Lady Karen Pence made few changes to the residence, besides the Second Lady's addition of a beehive to the grounds in 2017.

Vice President Kamala Harris and Second Gentleman Douglas Emhoff moved into Number One Observatory on April 7, 2021. They temporarily resided at Blair House during the renovations as they agreed to move in once the $3.8 million upgrades to the residence had been completed.  The repairs consisted of replacing chimney liners, heating, air-conditioning, and plumbing systems. Harris was responsible for having the kitchen remodeled and the hardwood floors refurbished. 

In October 2021, Emhoff affixed a white mezuzah to the right-hand side of the doorway of the residence's wooden entryway, which marked the first time an executive home in American history has carried the abiding sign of sanctity of a Jewish home. 

On November 28, 2021, Harris and Emhoff became the first second couple to light a menorah in the window of the official residence in celebration of the first night of Hanukkah. On April 15, 2022, Harris and Emhoff became the first known second family to host a Passover Seder at the vice president's residence.

Architecture and decoration

Queen Anne style 

The house is built in the Queen Anne style prevalent in the last quarter of the nineteenth century. Hallmarks of the Queen Anne style are an asymmetrical floor plan, a series of rooms opening to each other rather than a common central hall, round turret rooms, inglenooks near fireplaces, and broad verandas wrapping the ground floor, all of which are found at Number One Observatory Circle.

When the house was constructed, its exterior was faced in terracotta brick. The wood trim was painted in a warm putty-gray, and the wooden porch in a combination of the putty-gray and white. Window frames and mullions were painted the same gray, and shutters were painted olive green. The interior was furnished mostly with the personal furnishings of the Naval Observatory superintendent and later those of the chief of naval operations. Period photographs of the interior show middle-class nineteenth-century furnishings in various styles, including Eastlake. Walls were covered in patterned wall-papers.

By the first decade of the twentieth century, Victorian-style architecture had begun to fall out of fashion. Many houses that were initially built in brick or wood with complex painting were simplified and "colonialized" by being painted white. This frequently happened inside as well as outside. Substantial wood millwork of mahogany, quarter-sawn oak, American chestnut, and walnut were often painted over in white to "lighten" rooms and make them feel more contemporary. The home's exterior was originally dark red brick until 1960 when it was painted "feather" gray. It was changed to white with black shutters in 1963, and by 1993 was cream-colored.

Layout
The house's first floor has a dining room, garden room, living room, lounges, pantry kitchen, reception hall, sitting room, and veranda. The second floor contains the main bedroom suite, an additional bedroom, a den, and a study. The attic, once the servants' quarters, now houses four bedrooms. The main kitchen is located in the basement.

Interior furnishings 
Most of the furnishings placed in the house following the 1974 renovation were twentieth-century copies of either colonial or Federal style pieces. A notable exception was a bed placed in the house by Nelson Rockefeller. The bed was designed by surrealist artist Max Ernst. Called the "cage" bed, the headboard had the form of a Greek pediment, and the baseboard a lower version of a pediment. The Rockefellers twice offered the bed permanently to the house but it was turned down both by Vice President George H. W. Bush and Vice President Dan Quayle. On visiting Barbara Bush at the house, Mrs. Rockefeller offered her the bed, and Mrs. Bush responded, "you are always welcome in this house, but there's no need to bring your own bed." The Rockefellers did leave a lithograph called "The Great Ignoramus", several antique Korean and Japanese chests, and nearly a dozen other pieces.

When the Mondales occupied the house, Joan Mondale introduced more saturated upholstery and wall colors and contemporary art. Like the Rockefellers, the Mondales brought some Asian antiques into the house. The Bush family, working with interior decorator Mark Hampton, used a palette of celadon, lime green, and light blue. The Quayles removed the lime green and used off-white. The Gores oversaw a complete redecoration, the addition of a new dining-room table, new furniture for the library, and a substantial renovation of the grounds and porches to make them more suitable for outdoor entertaining. Immediately before the Cheneys moved in, some needed work on the air conditioning and heating was performed and the interiors were repainted. The Cheneys brought several pieces of contemporary art into the house.

Privacy and security

Privacy
Unlike the White House, Number One Observatory Circle, and the surrounding Naval Observatory, do not offer any public tours.

Underground bunker 
In December 2002, following the September 11 attacks, neighbors of the Number One Observatory Circle, then inhabited by Cheney, complained of loud "blasts" and construction noises. Occurring several times and lasting up to five seconds, the vibrations were able to knock mirrors off the walls of some nearby residences. Neighbors who complained about the construction received a letter from the observatory's superintendent reading, "Due to its sensitive nature in support of national security and homeland defense, project-specific information is classified and cannot be released." It was widely speculated that a nuclear bunker was being constructed.

In 2009, recently inaugurated Vice President Joe Biden reportedly revealed the existence of an underground "9/11" bunker beneath the house. Elizabeth Alexander, Biden's press secretary, explained the following day, "What the vice president described in his comments was not—as some press reports have suggested—an underground facility, but rather, an upstairs work space in the residence, which he understood was frequently used by Vice President Cheney and his aides." The Christian Science Monitor suggested that Biden was actually referring to a tunnel which leads to  one of the Navy-operated telescopes on the grounds.

See also
 White House – the official residence of the president of the United States
 Camp David – country retreat for the president of the United States
 Rapidan Camp – the predecessor to Camp David
 Blair House – the official state guest house for the president of the United States

References
Informational notes

Citations

External links 

 

Buildings of the United States government in Washington, D.C.
Continuity of government in the United States
Embassy Row
Houses completed in 1893
Houses in Washington, D.C.
Landmarks in Washington, D.C.
Official residences in the United States
Presidential residences
Palaces in the United States
Queen Anne architecture in Washington, D.C.
Vice presidency of the United States
Presidential homes in the United States